Héctor Facundo Vitale (born December 1, 1961, Villa Adelina, Buenos Aires province), known as Lito Vitale, is an Argentine musician, composer and arranger.

Career 
A talented piano player, he was coached by his mother, renowned music teacher Esther Soto, since childhood. Together with fellow musicians from his neighbourhood he co-founded the MIA music cooperative (MIA is the Spanish acronym of Independent Associated Musicians) when he was 13 years old. MIA became popular with progressive rock audiences in the late 1970s. The family atmosphere they projected and their suburban roots kept them aloof of the political turmoil of those times.

Other than Vitale's, MIA launched many careers, including Lito's sister Liliana, singer Veronica Condomi (who would eventually marry Lito) and instrumentalists Juan del Barrio and Daniel Curto.

Starting in 1980, Vitale launched a series of collaborations with several Argentine musicians. He performed and recorded with Dino Saluzzi and then with Bernardo Baraj (sax) and Lucho González (guitar) in what became known as "the Trio". This formation adapted many classic tango and folklore numbers, and became popular with college students, jazz audiences, and radio DJs. It was often compared to ECM acts such as the Pat Metheny quartet and the Keith Jarrett European quartet.

In the 1990s, Vitale recorded several tango standards with Juan Carlos Baglietto, and was awarded a Latin Grammy for their collaboration in 2000. Also during those years, Vitale recorded a more jazz-like project with Lucho González and flute player Rubén Mono Izarrualde. This formation performed in the 1998 Montreux Jazz Festival.

Vitale has also composed soundtracks for several Argentine films. He was awarded the prestigious Argentine Konex Award twice: as arranger in 1995, and as instrumentalist in 2005.

Partial discography

References

External links
  Official site
 
  Biography at Rock.com.ar

1961 births
Living people
Argentine musicians
Latin Grammy Award winners